Khaled Ben Slimane (born 1951 in Sousse) is a Tunisian artist mostly known for his ceramic work. He lives and works in Tunisia.

Biography 

Khaled Ben Slimane graduated in ceramics at the Institut Technologique d'Art, d'Architecture et d'Urbanisme in Tunis in 1977, and then studied at the Escuela Massana de Barcelona before returning to Tunisia in 1979.

Khaled Ben Slimane traveled in India, Iran and Pakistan between 1975 and 1976, and lived in Tokyo from 1982 to 1983, where he collaborated with Japanese ceramists.

Work 

In his work, Khaled Ben Slimane mixes Islamic art with a form of Westernized beauty.

Awards 

 1990: Elected member of the International Academy of Ceramics in Geneva.

References

Bibliography 

1951 births
Living people
People from Sousse
Tunisian ceramists
Tunisian contemporary artists
20th-century Tunisian painters
21st-century Tunisian painters
21st-century ceramists